Yes! is a Hong Kong teen lifestyle magazine with a slogan "All-weather Youth Magazine". Founded by Joe Nieh and Simon Siu on 20 November 1990, it was originally a semimonthly magazine published on every 5th and 20th of each month and priced at HK$10. Later it was changed to be published on every Friday (officially published on Friday, but usually sold in various bookstalls and convenience stores on Thursday, depending on area) and priced at HK$12. It was mainly published with double cover, sometimes with triple cover (e.g. issues 965, 974), issues 975 and 1000 are with quadruple cover, and, rarely, with single cover (e.g., issue 971, 983, 984). Every issue is sold with an idol product as a gift (e.g. issue 953 and 966 are sold with an idol A4 folder). It ceased publication on 25 July 2014 (issue 1219).

References

External links
 

Defunct magazines published in Hong Kong
Magazines established in 1990
Magazines disestablished in 2014
Teen magazines
Weekly magazines published in Hong Kong